XHMF-FM is a radio station on 104.5 FM in Monterrey, Nuevo León. The station is operated by Grupo Radio Centro and is a relay station of Mexico City corporate cousin XHFAJ-FM, both with the English Top 40/CHR format Alfa.

History
XHMF received its concession on May 7, 1985. It was owned by Radio General, S.A. In the mid-2000s, Grupo Radio México (since subsumed into Grupo Radio Centro) began operating the station with its Planeta pop format. On August 1, 2014, it became a relay station of Mexico City station XHFAJ-FM Alfa, with local advertising.

External links
Official site

References

Radio stations in Monterrey
Radio stations established in 1985
Grupo Radio Centro
1985 establishments in Mexico